Dorothy Lovett (February 16, 1915 – April 28, 1998) was an American film actress.

Biography

Early  and personal life 
Lovett was born in  Providence, Rhode Island. She married director Jack Hively (1910-1995) on December 25, 1941, while he was in the Air Force. Hively worked for RKO studios for a period. Lovett graduated from Pembroke College in Brown University with a major in sociology and a minor in psychology.

Film career 
Lovett's best-known recurring role is that of Judy Price in Meet Dr. Christian (1939), Remedy for Riches (1940), The Courageous Dr. Christian (1940), Dr. Christian Meets the Women (1940) and They Meet Again (1941). She spent almost the whole of her career with RKO studios, debuting in 1939. She was lent to Universal Studios to make The Green Hornet Strikes Again and retired from professional life in 1943 when her RKO contract expired.

Her last film appearance was a small role in 1965's A Patch of Blue.

Radio career 
Lovett's early radio experience came in Providence, where she performed on programs that included a cooking school, a dramatized serial, a shopping service, and a weekly fashion show.

In radio series, Lovett supplied the voices for Toni Sherwood on Rocky Jordan (1945-1947), Meta Bauer/Jan Carter on Guiding Light (1948-1949) and Grace Adam on The Seeking Heart (1953-1955). She also appeared on Dr. Christian, Lux Radio Theatre, Father Knows Best and many other radio programs.

TV career
In 1954, Lovett began portraying Grace Adam, a doctor's wife, in The Seeking Heart, a CBS daytime drama.

Death 
She died in Sherman Oaks, California.

Filmography

References

External links 

 

1915 births
1998 deaths
American film actresses
American radio actresses
RKO Pictures contract players
20th-century American actresses
Actors from Providence, Rhode Island
Actresses from Rhode Island
Brown University alumni